Houston Direct Navigation Company operated ships on Buffalo Bayou between 1866 and 1927. It had had two antecedent companies with similar subscriber lists and management: the Houston and Galveston Navigation Company, and the Houston Navigation Company.

Houston and Galveston Navigation Company
In 1851, William Marsh Rice founded the Houston and Galveston Navigation Company with his own capital of $5,000 and the capital of twenty-five other investors. These included Paul Bremond, Cornelius Ennis, William J. Hutchins, and John H. Sterrett.

Houston Navigation Company
One of the company's antecedents was the Houston Navigation Company, formed in 1854 by many of the same principals as the Houston and Galveston Navigation Company.

After the Civil War
The Houston Direct Navigation Company transported freight and passengers from Houston to railheads along Buffalo Bayou.
Houston Direct Navigation Company was founded on October 9, 1866, by William Marsh Rice, Thomas M. Bagby, John H. Sterrett, and several others.  Businesses receiving and shipping goods from Houston were paying high fees for moving freight through Galveston, Texas. The company offered cheaper transportation, which bypassed Galveston and its Galveston Wharf Company.

At first, the company's main business in the late-1860s consisted of lightering around Galveston and interlining freight through the Buffalo Bayou, Brazos and Colorado Railroad; however, it expanded  service, running five passenger steamers by 1870. The company continued to expand its fleet, even as passenger demand diminished. Three steamers operated for freight-only in 1873, along with 22 barges with three tugs, the only two steamers transported passengers.

References

Navigation organizations
American companies established in 1866
American companies disestablished in 1927
Companies based in Houston
Transportation companies based in Texas
Transportation in Houston
Transportation in Galveston, Texas
Water transportation in Texas
Defunct shipping companies of the United States